Pamela Fischer may refer to:

Pamela Fischer (lawyer), Canadian lawyer
Pamela Fischer (synchronized swimmer) (born 1988), Swiss synchronised swimmer